Gisilia subcrocea is a moth in the family Cosmopterigidae. It was described by Edward Meyrick in 1923. It is found in Egypt.

References

Moths described in 1923
Chrysopeleiinae
Moths of Africa